The 1923 Butler Bulldogs football team was an American football team that represented Butler University as an independent during the 1923 college football season. The team played its home games at Irwin Field  in Indianapolis.  In coach Harlan Page's 4th year, the Bulldogs posted a 7–2 record, went undefeated at home in 7 contests, and outscored their opponents 142 to 81.  Their two losses were against national champion Illinois, and Indiana state champion Notre Dame.

Schedule

Freshman team schedule

References

Butler
Butler Bulldogs football seasons
Butler Bulldogs football